Nivada is a Swiss watch manufacturing company, founded in the town of Grenchen, Switzerland in 1879. The company gained attraction after World War II, producing a series of successful watches before succumbing to the Quartz crisis.

In 1926, Nivada was operational in Grenchen as Wüllimann Schneider Nivada S.A. The company relied on proven movements from ETA and Phénix S.A., as was typical at the time, and the company was known for quality mass-produced watches. Nivada celebrated its 100th anniversary in 1979, at which point it was run by Max Schneider, grandson of the founder.

Nivada was prevented from using its name during the 1960s and 1970s due to its phonetic similarity with Movado, so the products were labeled "Nivada Grenchen". In the United States, Croton was formed in 1940 as a distributor for Nivada products, so many were sold under the "Croton Nivada", "Croton Nivada Grenchen", and simply "Croton" names.

The Nivada brand was also used in South Korea by the Kim Suk Keun Watch Company from 1985 through the 2000s but appears to be defunct now.

As of 2022, Nivada is still incorporated in Grenchen, Switzerland and the brand continues in some markets, notably in Mexico.

Products 
 Rollamatic (also "Rollador") using Phenix 200 movements.
 Reglavit, is a water-resistant watch with a unique external regulator screw.
 Antarctic was a long-running series of watches initiated in 1958 in celebration of the International Geophysical Year (IGY), and using the ETA 1256 or 2472 movements, as well as the A. Schild 1673.
 Depthmaster was a diving watch, water-resistant to 1,000 M.
 Depthomatic was another diving watch, water-resistant to 200 M, and using the ETA 2472 movement.
 Alertamatic was an alarm watch using the Lemania 2980 movement.
 Ultramatic 36000 (1975) used the rare 36,000 A/h ETA 2734 movement. Due to their close relation to Phenix/MSR, Nivada sold the Vulcain Cricket alarm watch under their brand as the Wanderer.

External links

Nivada Grenchen
Nivadaswiss.com

Companies established in 1879
Watch manufacturing companies of Switzerland
Watch brands
Companies based in the canton of Solothurn
Grenchen